Seraj Mahalleh (also Romanized as Serāj Maḩalleh) is a village in Siyahrud Rural District, in the Central District of Juybar County, Mazandaran Province, Iran. At the 2006 census, its population was 551, in 154 families.

References 

Populated places in Juybar County